The Kobozha is a river in Moshenskoy and Khvoyninsky Districts of Novgorod Oblast and in Chagodoshchensky and Ustyuzhensky Districts of Vologda Oblast in Russia. It is a left tributary of the Mologa.

The source of the Kobozha is in Lake Velikoye in the eastern part of Moshenskoy District, in the east of the Valday Hills. The river flows in the northern direction, crosses Khvoyninsky District, passing the railway station of Kabozha, and enters Vologda Oblast, where it turns northeast, smoothly turns southeast, and enters Ustyuzhensky District. The mouth of the Kobozha is in the village of Sofrontsevo.

The river basin of the Kobozha comprises the eastern parts of Moshenskoy and Khvoyninsky Districts, as well as the southern part of Chagodoshchensky District and minor areas in Ustyuzhensky District. The areas to the west of the basin belong to the river basin of the Msta and thus to the basins of the Baltic Sea and the Atlantic Ocean. The Kobozha belongs to the basin of the Caspian Sea.

Until the 1990s, the Kobozha was used for timber rafting.

References

External links
 

Rivers of Vologda Oblast
Rivers of Novgorod Oblast